Ringas Junction railway station is a model railway station (as declared by Indian Railways) in Sikar district, Rajasthan, India. It serves Reengus city and neighbouring Holy-town  Shree Khatu Shyam Ji. The station consists of three well-sheltered platforms. It has basic facilities including water and sanitation. The station was main metre-gauge junction till 2005, but after the construction of the broad-gauge track from Rewari and Narnaul  in the north to Phulera and Ajmer in the south, it is operational as an important BG junction now.

Major trains

 Ajmer–Delhi Sarai Rohilla Jan Shatabdi Express (via RPC)
 Bandra Terminus–Delhi Sarai Rohilla Express (via RPC)
 Chandigarh–Bandra Terminus Superfast Express (via RPC)
 Chetak Express (via RPC)
 Sainik Express(previously Shekhawati MG Express)
 Sikar–Jaipur–Ajmer DMU (via Phulera)
 Sikar–Jaipur DMU
 Shri Ganganagar - Bandra Terminus Amarapur Aravali Express (via Jaipur, Ahmedabad)
 Jaipur–Hisar Special (via RPC)
 RPC refers to - Chord Line.

References

Railway stations in Sikar district
Jaipur railway division